The black duiker (Cephalophus niger), also known as tuba in Dyula, is a forest-dwelling duiker found in the southern parts of Sierra Leone, Liberia, Côte d'Ivoire, Ghana, Benin, and Nigeria.

They have, not surprisingly, black coats. The head is a rust colour with a large red crest between the ears.

Black duikers live mainly in lowland rainforest, where they eat fruit, flowers, and leaves which have fallen from the canopy. They are probably diurnal, though this is surmised only from captive specimens. Black duiker are reported to be solitary, territorial animals.

The mating season of the black duikers is year round, but more offspring are born from November to January. The gestation period lasts 126 days, and is thus comparably short, usually only one young is born. Its average weight is 1.94 kg; it is weaned around 90 days of age. The birth interval is seven and a half months. In captivity, the black duiker lives up to 14 years.

An estimated 100,000 black duikers are left in the world; they are threatened by hunting and are considered to be in decline across their range.

References

C. P. Groves & D. M. Leslie, Jr.: Family Bovidae (Hollow-horned Ruminants). In: D. E. Wilson und R. A. Mittermeier (Hrsg.): Handbook of the Mammals of the World. Volume 2: Hooved Mammals. Lynx Edicions, 2011 (S. 764–765)

External links 
 Black duiker (Cephalophus niger) at ultimateungulate

black duiker
Mammals of West Africa
black duiker
black duiker